Pisanica  ( (1926-45:Ebenfelde)) is a settlement in the administrative district of Gmina Ełk, within Ełk County, Warmian-Masurian Voivodeship, in northern Poland.

References

Villages in Ełk County